Shirzat Bawudun (born June 1966) is a Uyghur politician and the former head of the department of justice in Xinjiang Uygur Autonomous Region, China. In July 1988, Shirzat graduated from the Northwest University of Politics and Law. In 1994, Shirzat joined the Chinese Communist Party (CCP). 

In April 2021, Shirzat was sentenced to death with a two year reprieve on separatist charges. According to the Xinjiang Higher People's Court, Shirzat had received bribes, worked with terrorist groups and engaged in separatist activates. This included publishing school textbooks with the intent to "split the country" and incite ethnic hatred. The court stated that the textbooks had influenced those involved in the  2009 Urumqi riots and the 2014 Urumqi railway station bombing. The son of an editor of the textbooks claimed that the textbooks had received approval from the government and that the charges were "absurd".

See also
Sattar Sawut

References

1966 births
Living people
Chinese Muslims
People's Republic of China politicians from Xinjiang
Chinese Communist Party politicians from Xinjiang
Uyghur politicians
Expelled members of the Chinese Communist Party
People from Hotan